The Manipur National Conference was a political party in the Indian state of Manipur. MNC was formed in 2002, when a split occurred in the Manipur State Congress Party. Two competing factions struggled to be recognized as the authentic MSCP. In the end the Election Commission recognized the Th. Chaoba-led group as the real MSCP. W Nipamacha Singh (former Chief Minister of Manipur) then re-christened his group as 'Manipur National Conference'.

Elections 
In the 2002 state assembly elections MNC supported the Secular Progressive Front. MNC won one seat in the elections.

Merger with RJD 
In 2005, MNC merged with RJD.

References

Further reading 

Political parties in Manipur
Political parties established in 2002
2002 establishments in Manipur